Liam John Slade (born 14 May 1995) is an English footballer who plays as a defender.

Career
After coming through Burton Albion's youth system, Slade signed a professional contract in July 2013. In November 2013, Slade joined Redditch United on a one-month loan deal. Slade made his début for Burton Albion in a 3–1 away loss to Bury on 20 September 2014 in League Two.

Career statistics

References

External links

1995 births
Living people
English footballers
Burton Albion F.C. players
Redditch United F.C. players
AFC Telford United players
English Football League players
Association football defenders